The Koffler Centre can refer to two centres named after Murray Koffler:
Koffler Student Centre at the University of Toronto
Koffler Centre of the Arts